Andrew B. Parrino (born October 31, 1985) is an American former professional baseball player. He has previously played in Major League Baseball (MLB) for the San Diego Padres and Oakland Athletics.

College
Parrino has Albanian origin from Italy, Sicily. Parrino played three years of college baseball at Le Moyne College in Syracuse, New York.  He was named the Metro Atlantic Athletic Conference Player of the Year in 2007.  He was only the second position player to make it to MLB out of Le Moyne.

Professional career

San Diego Padres
Parrino was drafted by the Padres in the 26th round of the 2007 MLB draft and signed by the team's Northeast Scouting Director, Jim Bretz. He was promoted to the Padres on August 26, 2011, to make his MLB debut.  He played in 24 games in 2011, playing third, shortstop, second, and the outfield.  Parrino collected 8 hits in 44 at-bats.

Parrino opened 2012 as the Padres' utility infielder, edging out Everth Cabrera in spring training. He made 24 starts at shortstop (18), second (5), and third (1) before being placed on the disabled list June 3 with a sprained right wrist. Parrino spent July and August with the Triple-A Tucson Padres, batting .328 in 65 games.  He was recalled from Triple-A on September 5 and finished out the season with 7 more starts in 15 games played, picking up 8 hits in 24 at-bats.  For the season, he totaled a .207 batting average with a .316 on-base percentage.

Oakland Athletics
Parrino was traded to the Oakland Athletics on November 16, 2012, with Andrew Werner for Tyson Ross and A.J. Kirby-Jones.

At the end of 2013 spring training, Oakland optioned him to Triple-A Sacramento. On April 10, 2013, Parrino was recalled by Oakland to replace the injured Scott Sizemore.

On February 27, 2014, Parrino was designated for assignment by the Athletics. The Texas Rangers claimed him on March 3. He was claimed off waivers by the Athletics on April 21, 2014. Parrino was recalled to the Athletics on August 15, after an injury to starting shortstop Jed Lowrie.

On January 10, 2015, Parrino was designated for assignment. On May 22, Athletics purchased his contract from Triple-A Nashville. He played 17 games for the Athletics before being returned to Nashville, where he played the rest of the season. He elected to become a free agent at the season's end.

Chicago White Sox
On December 4, 2015, Parrino signed a minor league deal with the Chicago White Sox. He became a free agent on November 7, 2016.

References

External links

1985 births
Living people
American people of Arbëreshë descent
American people of Italian descent
Baseball players at the 2015 Pan American Games
Baseball players from New York (state)
Eugene Emeralds players
Fort Wayne TinCaps players
Fort Wayne Wizards players
Gigantes del Cibao players
American expatriate baseball players in the Dominican Republic
Oakland Athletics players
Lake Elsinore Storm players
Le Moyne Dolphins baseball players
Nashville Sounds players
Pan American Games medalists in baseball
Pan American Games silver medalists for the United States
People from Brockport, New York
Round Rock Express players
Sacramento River Cats players
San Antonio Missions players
San Diego Padres players
Tucson Padres players
United States national baseball team players
Medalists at the 2015 Pan American Games